Clarendon County may refer to:

 Clarendon County, New South Wales, Australia
 Clarendon County, South Carolina, USA